The 1991 New York Jets season was the 32nd season for the team and the 22nd in the National Football League. It began with the team trying to improve upon its 6–10 record from 1990 under head coach Bruce Coslet. 

The Jets finished the season with a record of 8-8, qualifying for the playoffs for the first time since 1986 as one of three AFC Wild Card teams losing by the Houston Oilers in their Wild Card round matchup, 17-10. The Jets would not make the playoffs again until 1998.

For the second time in their history, the Jets suffered the embarrassment of losing at home to a team which would finish 1-15. The Colts defeated the Jets 28-27 at Giants Stadium in week 11, their lone win under interim coach Rick Venturi. In 1980, the Jets lost 21-20 to the Saints at Shea Stadium in week 15.

Offseason

NFL Draft

Personnel

Staff

Roster

Preseason

Schedule

Regular season

Schedule

Standings

Season Game Summaries

Week 1 (Sunday, September 1, 1991): vs. Tampa Bay Buccaneers 

Point spread: 
 Over/Under: 
 Time of Game: 2 hours, 50 minutes

Week 2 (Sunday, September 8, 1991): at Seattle Seahawks

Week 3 (Sunday, September 15, 1991): vs. Buffalo Bills

Week 4 (Monday, September 23, 1991): at Chicago Bears

Week 5 (Sunday, September 29, 1991): vs. Miami Dolphins

Week 6 (Sunday, October 6, 1991): at Cleveland Browns

Week 7 (Sunday, October 13, 1991): vs. Houston Oilers

Week 8 (Sunday, October 20, 1991): at Indianapolis Colts

Week 9: BYE WEEK

Week 10 (Sunday, November 3, 1991): vs. Green Bay Packers

Week 11 (Sunday, November 10, 1991): vs. Indianapolis Colts

Week 12 (Sunday, November 17, 1991): at New England Patriots

Week 13 (Sunday, November 24, 1991): vs. San Diego Chargers

Week 14 (Sunday, December 1, 1991): at Buffalo Bills

Week 15: (Sunday, December 8, 1991): at Detroit Lions

Week 16 (Sunday, December 15, 1991): vs. New England Patriots

Week 17 (Sunday, December 22, 1991): at Miami Dolphins

Postseason

Playoff Game Summaries

AFC Wild Card Playoffs (Sunday, December 29, 1991): at Houston Oilers

References

External links 
 1991 statistics

New York Jets seasons
New York Jets
New York Jets season
20th century in East Rutherford, New Jersey
Meadowlands Sports Complex